Rich Adams is a retired American basketball player. He played four years with the University of Illinois varsity in the NCAA, averaged 5.1 points as a freshman in coach Gene Bartow's only season with the fighting Illinois. The next year, Adams boosted his scoring clip to 15.9 as new coach Lou Henson steered the varsity to a 14–13 mark, a dramatic leap from the 8–19 record the previous year.

Adams was picked in the fourth round by the San Antonio Spurs in the 1978 NBA Draft. He failed to make it in the majors and saw action instead for the Reno Bighorns in the Western Basketball Association in 1978–79. He had overseas stints in Dubai playing for the Emirates Sports Club and the Philippines.

His daughter is the Team USA Volleyball team middle Rachael Adams.

References

External links
Rich Adams @ basketball.realgm.com
1978 NBA Draft @ basketball-reference.com

1956 births
Living people
American men's basketball players
Basketball players from Illinois
Centers (basketball)
Illinois Fighting Illini men's basketball players
Power forwards (basketball)
San Antonio Spurs draft picks
Basketball players from Cincinnati
Shell Turbo Chargers players
Great Taste Coffee Makers players
American expatriate basketball people in the Philippines
Philippine Basketball Association imports